Panama is the debut album by A Balladeer, released in 2006. It peaked at No. 30 on the Dutch Album Charts and at No. 12 on the Alternative Chart.

Track listing
(All songs written by Marinus de Goederen unless otherwise noted)

 "Summer" - 3:49
 "Blank" - 3:42
 "All I Wanted" - 4:38
 "Pre-Berlin" - 3:56
 "Sirens" - 3:33
 "Winterschläfer" - 3:48
 "Robin II" - 6:22
 "Fortune Teller" - 3:14
 "Hamburg" - 1:21
 "Copper Shades" - 3:25
 "Swim with Sam" - 4:26
 "Herbst"  - 2:35

References

2006 albums